The Bayer designation ζ Muscae (Zeta Muscae, ζ Mus) is shared by two stars in the constellation Musca:
ζ1 Muscae
ζ2 Muscae
Located 2.6° to the west of Beta Muscae, the pair are described as, "a soft creamy coloured primary with a pale orange companion".

References

Muscae, Zeta
Musca (constellation)